Richard Isberner (born January 10, 1988 in São Paulo) is a Brazilian footballer.

Career
Isberner played four years of college soccer at the University of Rio Grande between 2009 and 2012. He also played for USL PDL clubs New Orleans and West Virginia Chaos.

Isberner signed his first professional contract with USL Pro club Wilmington Hammerheads in April 2013. He made his debut on May 10, 2013 during a 1-0 loss to Rochester Rhinos.

References

External links
 USL profile

1988 births
Living people
Brazilian footballers
Brazilian expatriate footballers
New Orleans Jesters players
West Virginia Chaos players
Wilmington Hammerheads FC players
Footballers from São Paulo
Expatriate soccer players in the United States
USL League Two players
USL Championship players
Association football forwards